Andrew Palmer (born July 10, 1994) is an American racing driver from Chicago, Illinois. He is a former official Lamborghini GT3 Junior driver and is currently contracted to Bentley Team Absolute. He is most known for winning the inaugural Lamborghini World Championship in 2013. He is also the youngest ever winner in the Pirelli World-Challenge, class winner of the 2015 24 Hours of Daytona, 2015 12 Hours of Sebring, and 2015 Petit Le Mans.  With Lamborghini, he recorded their first ever overall win as a manufacturer at Monza in 2015.

Early life and education
Palmer was born on July 10, 1994 in Chicago, USA.  He started his career in motorsports at age 10 racing at Chicago Indoor Racing before joining the outdoor team.  He is the oldest of three children.  He graduated from Pomona College in 2015 with a degree in Mathematical Economics. He currently resides in Los Angeles.

Racing career

Karting
Palmer began karting at the age of 10 years in 2004.  He quickly began to win national races before securing his first Rotax National Championship in 2010.  He went on to be a Team USA member 3 times (2010, 2012, 2013) competing at the Rotax World Finals with a best finish of 13th.  He also secured a World Karting Association National title in 2012.

Lamborghini Super Trofeo
In 2013, Palmer was given the opportunity with GMG Racing to compete in the final rounds of the Lamborghini Super Trofeo Championship in North America.  He qualified on pole and won in his inaugural weekend at Virginia International Raceway.  A few months later, Palmer was invited to the Lamborghini Super Trofeo World Championships in Rome, Italy.  After winning the event at the age of 19, he was crowned the first ever Lamborghini Super Trofeo World Champion.

Sports Cars
In 2014, Palmer signed with Audi Sport Customer Racing team GMG Racing to compete in the Pirelli World Challenge.  He became the youngest overall race winner in only his 4th start.  He eventually finished 5th in the driver standings.

Also in 2014, Palmer filled in for an injured Seth Neiman and drove for Flying Lizard Motorsports in the WeatherTech SportsCar Championship Road America round.  Later in the year he returned to the team to compete in Petit Le Mans with co-drivers Spencer Pumpelly and Nelson Canache.

Throughout 2014, Palmer was one of the lead drivers involved in the development of the Lamborghini Huracan GT3 car.  His involvement was a result of being part of the Lamborghini Young Driver program.  In January 2015 he was offered an official contract from Lamborghini to drive one of the factory cars in the 2015 Blancpain Endurance Series.

In addition to driving for the factory supported Lamborghini program in Europe, Palmer also competed in the endurance races in the WeatherTech SportsCar Championship for PR1 Motorsport alongside Tom Kimber-Smith and Mike Guasch where they had an almost perfect season winning their class in the 2015 24 Hours of Daytona, 2015 12 Hours of Sebring, and 2015 Petit Le Mans.

Palmer was contracted to Bentley to drive in the 2016 Pirelli World Challenge season driving the Bentley Continental GT3, finishing in the top ten on many occasions.
During May 2016 Palmer was injured in a major accident during warm up in the Pirelli World Challenge at Lime Rock Park, suffering a head injury. It is not known when he will return to racing.

Racing record

US Endurance results

Blancpain Endurance Series results

References

External links
 
 

1994 births
Living people
American racing drivers
WeatherTech SportsCar Championship drivers
Blancpain Endurance Series drivers
Asian Le Mans Series drivers
Pomona College alumni
Racing drivers from Chicago
Racing drivers from Illinois
Sportspeople from Chicago